Stanley Rogers Resor (December 5, 1917 – April 17, 2012) was an American lawyer, military officer, and government official.

Early life and education
Born in New York City, he was the son of Helen Lansdowne Resor and Stanley B. Resor (pronounced REE-zor), president of the J. W. Thompson advertising agency and one of the originators of the modern advertising industry. While still a teenager he changed his name from Stanley Burnet Resor Jr. to Stanley Rogers Resor.

After attending the Groton School, Resor attended Yale University, where he was tapped to join Scroll and Key. He graduated in 1939 and went on to Yale Law School where he was a contemporary of Sargent Shriver (also a member of Scroll and Key), Gerald Ford, and Cyrus Vance (who preceded him as Secretary of the Army and himself was a member of Scroll and Key and in the same year at Yale). Resor's education was interrupted by service as an Army officer in World War II (1942–1946), where he was awarded the Silver Star, Bronze Star, and the Purple Heart.

Career 
After the war, Resor went to work on Wall Street, and was made partner in the prominent Debevoise & Plimpton law firm. In 1965 during the Vietnam War, President Lyndon Johnson appointed him Secretary of the Army and he remained in the position under President Richard Nixon until 1971. In 1984, he was awarded the United States Military Academy's Sylvanus Thayer Award.

During the 1970s he served as US ambassador to the MBFR (mutual and balanced force reduction) talks in Vienna, held between NATO and the Warsaw Pact. Over time he grew critical of U.S. policy regarding nuclear weapons, and was a member of and spokesperson for the Arms Control Association of America in 1997 when it protested NATO expansion into Eastern Europe based on concerns about the reaction of the Russian government to perceived encroachment by NATO. He returned to Debevoise & Plimpton after he left government service and retired in 1991.

Personal life 
Resor married Jane Pillsbury of the Pillsbury family in 1942 in a ceremony attended by John F. Kennedy and Cyrus Vance. They had seven sons. After Jane's death in 1994 he married Louise Mead Resor in 1999.

Notes

1917 births
2012 deaths
Groton School alumni
Yale Law School alumni
Yale University alumni
United States Secretaries of the Army
United States Army colonels
United States Army personnel of World War II
Lawyers from New York City
Recipients of the Silver Star
Resor family
United States Under Secretaries of the Army
United States Under Secretaries of Defense for Policy
People associated with Debevoise & Plimpton
20th-century American lawyers